The Count of Brechard (Italian: Il conte di Brechard) is a 1938 Italian historical drama film directed by Mario Bonnard and starring Amedeo Nazzari, Luisa Ferida, and Ugo Ceseri. It was adapted from the Giovacchino Forzano play. The film's sets were designed by the art director Virgilio Marchi.

Main cast
 Amedeo Nazzari as Francesco di Bréchard 
 Luisa Ferida as Maria 
 Ugo Ceseri as Pérault 
 Camillo Pilotto as Licurgo 
 Mario Ferrari as Socrate 
 Maria Donati as Euterpe 
 Romano Calò as Gastel 
 Carlo Tamberlani as Carlo, Visconte di Bréchard 
 Armando Migliari as Roberto 
 Franco Coop as Matteo 
 Tina Lattanzi as Queen Marie Antoinette
 Febo Mari as Richard 
 Giorgio Capecchi as Gerly 
 Aristide Garbini as Grange 
 Floriana Morresi as The countess

References

Bibliography
 Michael Klossner. The Europe of 1500-1815 on Film and Television: A Worldwide Filmography of Over 2550 Works, 1895 Through 2000. McFarland & Company, 2002.

External links 

1938 films
1930s historical drama films
Italian historical drama films
1930s Italian-language films
Films directed by Mario Bonnard
Films set in France
Films set in the 1790s
French Revolution films
Cultural depictions of Marie Antoinette
1938 drama films
1930s Italian films